Augustus J. "Gus" Heege (1862 – February 2, 1898) was an American playwright and actor, whose works were popular at the end of the 19th century.

Early life
A native of Cleveland, Ohio, Gus Heege was the son of a prominent member of the city's police department. He attended the district school in nearby Brecksville where he entertained his fellow students with all manner of performances, giving an early indication of his acting talents. Soon after graduating from Cleveland's Central High School, he headed East to seek his fortune on the New York stage.

Career

A talented actor, Heege often took the leading role in his productions.  Although his output was varied, he is largely remembered for the Swedish immigrant trilogy, Ole Olson (1889), Yon Yonson (1890) and Yenuine Yentleman (1895). These plays established the character of the comic Swedish immigrant in American theater.

Heege, who was of German ancestry, maintained that careful observation of the newcomers had enabled him to faithfully portray them on stage. A newspaper account told of his field research in the "Little Scandinavia" of northern Wisconsin, where large numbers of Swedes, Norwegians and Danes had settled.

Not everyone found his characters believable. In reviewing Yon Yonson  a critic wrote: "The hero is a Swede who speaks English with Scandinavian dialect, the accuracy of which is vouched for by Mr. William M. Dunlevy, the enterprising manager of the Park Theatre, and Mr. Jacob Litt, the manager of this particular play, who are old log-rollers themselves.  We are quite willing to accept their word for it, especially as no man would be likely to invent such a dialect.  But the Swedes and Norwegians we have in the East do not speak English in the Yon Yonson way."<ref>New York Times December 29, 1891.</ref>

The author Willa Cather gave a decidedly negative review to Heege's Rush City in the Nebraska State Journal while conceding that Yon Yonson had been a "very good comedy". In 1931 Cather wrote that before 1913, when her novel O Pioneers! was published, "the Swede had never appeared on the printed page in this country except in broadly humorous sketches; and the humor was based on two peculiarities: his physical strength and his inability to pronounce the letter 'J'".

Ben Hendricks (1868-1930) was the actor most associated with Heege's Scandinavian dialect plays.  He starred in all three of them and toured with revivals of Ole Olson until 1912, over twenty years after the play's opening.

Later years
In time Heege's portrayal of Swedish immigrants found both popular and critical acceptance. Heege died at his home in Cleveland on February 2, 1898, of kidney disease.

After the playwright's death, the American Dramatists' Club passed the following resolution: "That in his demise the stage has been deprived of one of its truest dialectic disciples, an actor of refined quality, a pronounced genius in the depiction of Swedish and Scandinavian character, and a cheerful, charitable spirit."

Gus Heege's final work, Amalia Mora, was a Swedish-American opera that premiered in 1901."Amalia Mora" by Gus Heege and Max Faetkenheuer www.loc.gov. Retrieved June 6, 2015. His son, Philip, also became a Broadway actor.Philip Heege ibdb.com. Retrieved June 06, 2015.

Selected worksWanted: The Earth 1887Criss Cross 1888Sky Skraper 1888Ole Olson 1889Yon Yonson 1890Rush City 1893Yenuine Yentleman 1895Amalia Mora'' 1901

See also
 Scandinavian dialect humor

Gallery

References

External links

Newspaper transcriptions
Article
"Preparing A Swedish Delicacy" in the New York Times (January 28, 1895)
Reviews
Yon Yonson in the New York Times (December 29, 1891)
Rush City in the New York Times (April 17, 1894)
Willa Cather on Rush City in the Nebraska State Journal (October 14, 1894)
Amalia Mora in the ''New York Dramatic Mirror (August 24, 1901)
Obituaries
"Death Of Gus Heege" in the New York Times ( February 3, 1898)
"The Death Of Gus Heege" in the New York Dramatic Mirror (February 12, 1898)
"Death of Original Ole" in the Hawaiian Gazette (March 11, 1898)
Streaming audio at the Internet Archive
Vintage Scandinavian humor

1862 births
1898 deaths
19th-century American dramatists and playwrights
19th-century American male actors
American humorists
American male dramatists and playwrights
American male stage actors
American people of German descent
Male actors from Cleveland
Writers from Ohio
19th-century American male writers